Lecce Airfield is an abandoned World War II military airfield in Italy, which is located approximately 8.5 miles southwest from Lecce in the Salentine Peninsula. Built in 1943 by United States Army Engineers, the airfield was primarily a Fifteenth Air Force B-24 Liberator heavy bomber base used in the strategic bombing of Germany. Lecce was also used by tactical aircraft of Twelfth Air Force in the Italian Campaign.

Known units assigned to the airfield were:
 98th Bombardment Group, 17 January 1944 – 19 April 1945, B-24 Liberator, (15AF)
 82d Fighter Group, 10 October 1943 – 11 January 1944, P-38 Lightning, (12AF)
 416th Night Fighter Squadron, 27–30 September 1943, Bristol Beaufighter (12 AF)

The airfield today operates as Lecce Galatina Air Base.

References

 Maurer, Maurer. Air Force Combat Units of World War II. Maxwell AFB, Alabama: Office of Air Force History, 1983. .

External links

Airfields of the United States Army Air Forces in Italy
Airports established in 1943
1943 establishments in Italy
1945 disestablishments in Italy